S.p.A., operating as Costa Cruises, is an Italian cruise line founded in 1854 and organized as a wholly owned subsidiary of Carnival Corporation & plc since 2000. Based in Genoa, Italy, the cruise line primarily caters to the Italian cruise market, but the company's 10 ships, which all sail under the Italian flag, provide itineraries sailing to countries globally.

History

Costa Line 
Founded in Genoa in 1854 by Giacomo Costa (1836-1916) as Giacomo Costa fu Andrea, the company originally operated cargo ships, carrying olive oils and textiles. In 1924, the company was passed to the founder's sons (Federico, Eugenio and Enrico) and started commercial activities, buying the ship, Ravenna. In 1947, the name of the company was changed to Linea C.

Commercial activities continued for one more year until 1948, with the introduction of passenger services, beginning with regular services between Italy and South America operated by the ship, Anna C. She marked the start of scheduled operations between Italy and South America after being the first ocean liner to cross the South Atlantic Ocean following World War II.

	
In 1958, Costa commissioned their first purpose-built ship, Federico C , which provided a liner service between Genoa, Italy and Buenos Aires, Argentina via Rio de Janeiro, Brazil. In 1959, the company gradually transitioned into offering more pleasure holidays, with trips being offered in the Mediterranean and the Caribbean regions. The second purpose built ship, Eugenio C, debuted in 1966, designed by famous naval architect Nicolò Costanzi. Linea C went on to own 12 more ships by 1980, making the company the owner of the world's largest fleet of passenger ships. In 1986, Linea C changed its name to Costa Cruises and became a cruise-centered business. 

The line had decided to modernize its fleet by the late 1980s, and ordered two new ships in 1987, which became Costa Classica and Costa Romantica entering service in 1991 and 1993 respectively. The line also converted and completely rebuilt two former container ships into Costa Marina and Costa Allegra around the same time as ordering the two new ships. Costa wanted to create a new upscale European brand for their new ships and launched the short-lived EuroLuxe brand. Costa Victoria debuted in 1996, and was the final ship designed under the Costa family brand before the line was taken over by Carnival Corporation & plc.
	
In March 1997, Carnival and Airtours PLC purchased Costa Cruises for $300 million, on a 50:50 basis. At the time, Costa Cruises was the leading European cruise line, with an estimated market share of 19%.

Carnival subsidiary 
After Carnival's take over, a new-building program commenced for the line, utilizing Carnival Cruise Lines Spirit-class and Destiny-class design platforms for the new ships. They line would also utilize Carnival's designer Joe Farcus, who undertook the interior design, moving away from the contemporary Italian style of the previous ships to more themed public spaces similar to Carnival Cruise Line. The first ship delivered under Carnival Corp management, was Costa Atlantica in 2000.

In 2000, Carnival Corporation took full control of Costa Crociere after buying out Airtours' 50% interest for $525 million. In 2002, Carnival Corporation and P&O Princess Cruises merged to form Carnival Corporation & plc, bringing together both companies' assets under one corporation. As of 2018, Costa accounted for approximately 12% of Carnival Corporation & plc's revenue.

In 2004, Costa Crociere purchased control of AIDA Cruises of Germany. Carnival Corporation and the Spanish tour operator Orizonia Group created a joint venture in 2007, Ibero Cruises, which was absorbed into Costa Cruises in 2014.

The company attracted international attention when Costa Concordia ran aground and capsized off the coast of Italy on 13 January 2012. Thirty-two people died in the disaster. Six weeks later, the company made headlines again when a fire on Costa Allegra left it drifting without power for 13 hours in waters near Somalia frequented by pirates, before the ship was taken under tow.

In February 2018, Costa announced its partnership with the Italian football club, Juventus.

Owing to the Covid pandemic of 2020, Costa sold off ships in its fleet including the Costa Victoria and Costa neoRomantica to help cut costs. It also lead to the continued long term layup of the Costa Magica and Costa Serena.

In December 2019, Costa debuted Costa Smeralda and became the second cruise line to operate a cruise ship fully powered by liquefied natural gas (LNG), following AIDA's  one year earlier. Costa Smeralda was joined by her sister LNG ship, Costa Toscana, in 2021.

In 2022, parent company Carnival Corp. announced they would be transferring ships out of the fleet to help balance overall fleet capacities due to the pandemic and the selling off of numerous ships. It was announced the Costa Luminosa would be transferred to Carnival Cruise Line, the Costa Venezia and  the Costa Firenze will join Carnival Fleet under the new Carnival Fun Italian Style concept in 2023 and 2024 respectively.

In February 2023, it was announced that Costa Magica was sold to Seajets, a Greek/Cypriot ferry company.

Fleet

Current fleet

Laid Up

Former fleet 
Costa's former passenger ship fleet in chronological order:

Accidents and incidents 
See also Carnival Cruise Line's accidents and incidents for incidents associated with the parent company's other cruise operations.

MV Bianca C. fire and sinking 

On 22 October 1961, Bianca C. was off Grenada when an explosion occurred in the engine room. Two crew members died in the explosion and the ship subsequently caught on fire. Local fishermen helped rescue the passengers and crew, but as the local authorities did not have the equipment to extinguish the fire, the ship was left to burn until the British frigate  arrived from Puerto Rico. The burning ship was in the main anchorage and would block the harbour if it sank there, so the Londonderry towed it to a different location where the Bianca C. sank on 24 October 1961.

Costa Europa collision with pier 

On 25 February 2010, Costa Europa collided with a pier in Sharm El Sheikh in Egypt, killing 3 crew members and injuring 4. Costa blamed strong winds for the collision.

Costa Classica collision 

On 18 October 2010, Costa Classica collided with the Belgian bulk carrier, Lowlands Longevity in  the mouth of the Yangtze river. The collision caused a gash over 60 feet long in the side of the ship.

Costa Concordia capsizing 

On 13 January 2012, Costa Concordia ran aground off Isola del Giglio in Tuscany. The ship capsized and partially sank, killing 32 people. In 2014, the ship was parbuckled and refloated with caissons, and in July 2014, she was towed to the Port of Genoa over a period of five days, where it was dismantled and eventually scrapped. The total cost of the disaster was estimated to be over $2 billion.

On 11 February 2015, the captain at the helm during the sinking, Francesco Schettino, was found guilty by an Italian court of multiple manslaughter, causing the shipwreck, and abandoning his passengers. He was sentenced to 16 years in prison. An Italian appeals court on 31 May 2016 upheld the 16-year prison sentence.

Costa Allegra engine room fire 

On 27 February 2012, Costa Allegra suffered an engine room fire and went adrift in the Indian Ocean. After several days adrift without power, the ship was towed to the Seychelles island of Desroches, but was unable to dock there. She was then towed to Mahé, Seychelles, where the passengers disembarked. No casualties were reported.

On 9 March 2012, it was announced that Costa Allegra would not return to service with Costa, and she was given to the shipping company, Themis Maritime Ltd. In late 2012, Costa Allegra was beached at Aliaga, Turkey, for scrapping.

Temporary shutdown due to the COVID-19 pandemic 
Costa cruises around the world were cancelled in March 2020 due to the worldwide COVID-19 pandemic.

Costa began new sailings on 6 September in Italy, initially with two ships, Costa Deliziosa and Costa Diadema. At that time, the line required all passengers to be from Italy. By 27 September 2020, however, it was reported that, having implemented strict health protocols to protect its staff and guests, "Costa Cruises will be available for all European citizens who are residents in any of the countries listed in the most recent decree from the Prime Minister of Italy".

A report on 9 January 2021 stated that some cruise lines were hoping to resume some sailings in Europe in the near future but added that "it remains to be seen whether this will go ahead with much of the continent still in lockdown". Costa's Web site at that time was indicating no sailings in January but was hoping to start on 28 February with Costa Firenze, on 2 April with Costa Deliziosa, on 3 April with Costa Magica, and so on. Only Italian ports would be used initially, and the gradual restart would accept only guests from Italy.

Gallery

References

Notes

Bibliography

External links

Costa Line – Linea "C" Page 1A – The Early Liners 1948–65

 
Carnival Corporation & plc
Companies based in Genoa
Cruise lines
Hospitality companies established in 1924
Shipping companies of Italy